Sara Sheffield is an American singer and Marine from Jacksonville, Texas who, in 2005, became the first female feature vocalist in the history of the United States Marine Band.

Early life and education
Sara Sheffield, a mezzo-soprano, was raised in Jacksonville, Texas. As a child, she was trained in piano, but later switched her musical focus to voice.

Sheffield's first solo vocal performance was at the age of 11 at Jacksonville's Central Baptist Church. Five years later she began private voice lessons. She graduated from Jacksonville High School in 1997. While in high school, Sheffield was a three time member of the Texas All-State Choir. In 2001, Sheffield received a bachelor of music in vocal performance from the University of North Texas College of Music, where she studied under Cody Garner. She later earned a Master of Business Administration from George Mason University.

Career
After completion of her undergraduate studies at the University of North Texas, Sheffield apprenticed at the El Paso Opera and Amarillo Opera and then enlisted in the U.S. Army as a vocalist. She completed United States Army Basic Training at Fort Jackson in South Carolina and was posted to the Military District of Washington, where she was assigned to "Pershing's Own" United States Army Band at Fort Myer.

In 2004, she auditioned for "the President's Own" United States Marine Band and, in May 2005, was accepted as the first female vocalist in the ensemble's then 207-year history.

In 2008 Sheffield was named a regional finalist in the Metropolitan Opera National Council Mid-Atlantic Auditions.

Awards and decorations
Sheffield's awards include the Navy and Marine Corps Commendation Medal, Army Commendation Medal, Army Achievement Medal, and Marine Corps Good Conduct Medal, Sixth Award.

See also
 Bill Pearce

References

External links
 Sheffield performs the Star-Spangled Banner in 2016 at the National Press Club

 National Anthem: Sara Sheffield

United States Marine Band musicians
People from Jacksonville, Texas
Military personnel from Texas
Musicians from Texas
University of North Texas alumni
George Mason University alumni
Living people
Year of birth missing (living people)